"Call Me, Beep Me!", or "The Kim Possible Song", is the theme song for the Disney Channel series Kim Possible. The song was written by Cory Lerios and George Gabriel.

In the song, Kim Possible (the main character of the series) tells listeners to "call" or "beep" her if "there's trouble", no "matter if it's day or night", and promises she will not fail them and will rush to help. Thus, it reflects the use of modern-day mobile technologies.

The original version of the song, which played over the opening sequence of the 2002 series, was recorded by Christina Milian and is a catchy punchy Motown-flavored R&B number.

Since then, the song has been covered by many artists, notably by Priscilla in 2006 in French, by the groups Preluders in 2004 and Banaroo in 2006 in English, Beni in 2005 in Japanese, and by Kiki Ting in Mandarin.

In 2015, the original version of the song claimed the number one spot in the ranking of the "Disney Channel Theme Songs of Yesteryear".

The song is also used as the theme song for the 2019 live-action film adaptation. In addition to Millian's version returning and being used in the film's opening sequence, a new version was produced for the film, sung by its lead actress, Sadie Stanley. Her version received a modern dance-pop arrangement and differs greatly from the original version of the song.

Track listings

Preluders version 
CD maxi single "Walking on Sunshine" / "Call Me, Beep Me" (Cheyenne 500 418-8, 2004)
 "Walking on Sunshine" (Radio Edit) – 3:35
 "Call Me, Beep Me" (Radio Edit) – 2:36
 "Walking on Sunshine" (Karaoke) – 3:35
Extras: "Call Me, Beep Me" (Video) – 2:36

Banaroo version 
CD maxi single "Uh Mamma" (Na klar! 500 987 773-6, 24 February 2006)
 "Uh Mamma" (Radio Edit) – 3:14
 "Uh Mamma" (The Navigator RmxVers. 1.2) – 4:20
 "Uh Mamma" (Retro Filter Mix) – 4:21
 "Uh Mamma" (Instrumental) – 3:12
 "Call Me, Beep Me!" – 3:02

Priscilla version 
Digital download single (Walt Disney Records, 30 June 2006)
 "Mission Kim Possible" – 2:36

Sadie Stanley version 
Digital download single (Walt Disney Records, 11 January 2019)
 "Call Me, Beep Me! (From "Kim Possible")" – 2:41

References 

2002 songs
2004 singles
2006 singles
2019 singles
Christina Milian songs
Banaroo songs
Preluders songs
Priscilla Betti songs
Beni (singer) songs
Songs from animated series
Animated series theme songs
Children's television theme songs
Songs written by Cory Lerios
Walt Disney Records singles
Songs about telephone calls
Kim Possible